Cannington is a southern suburb of Perth, Western Australia. Its local government area is the City of Canning.

History
Cannington's name derives from the Canning River, which forms part of the southwestern boundary of the suburb. It was first subdivided in 1882, and a railway station was constructed in the 1890s opposite Station Street in what is now East Cannington.

Waverley
For many years the areas of Cannington, East Cannington and Beckenham were known locally as "Waverley" and many buildings and businesses used the name Waverley to designate their locality, such as the Waverley Hotel and the Waverley Drive In Cinema. The origin of the alternative use of Waverley is designated to the Cecil Gibbs who first used it in naming the Waverley Hotel that was a distinctive landmark over many generations. Between 1860 and 1883, William Lacey Gibbs, gradually accumulated most of what is Cannington. His slaughter yards were located near the present-day Myer Department Store, Westfield. His brother built the 'Cecil/Waverley' Hotel on the corner of Cecil Road and Albany Highway. The hotel was altered many times over the years and was recently demolished for widening of the Albany Highway.

Geography
Cannington is bounded by Nicholson Road to the southeast, the Armadale railway line to the northeast, Mills and Burton Streets to the northwest, and Fleming Avenue and the Canning River to the southwest. Albany Highway runs through the western part of the suburb.

Facilities  
Cannington contains one of the Perth metropolitan area's largest shopping complexes, Westfield Carousel, first built in 1972 and extensively refurbished and expanded in the 1990s, which includes a Hoyts cinema complex. Albany Highway contains a range of shops and small warehouses, as well as the City of Canning council offices. Bentley Hospital is just beyond the northwestern boundary on Mills Street.

Along the Canning River is the Canning River Regional Park, which contains walking tracks and picnic facilities as well as the Woodloes Museum, a restored 1874 house built by architect and pioneer Francis Bird. Various sports and leisure facilities, including soccer fields, ten-pin bowling and an indoor athletics centre. The Canning showgrounds includes the Cannington Exhibition Centre and was home to the Cannington Raceway owned by the Western Australian Greyhound Racing Association from 1974 to 2015. The greyhound racing now takes place across the road on the north side on a new track which opened on 23 March 2016.

Cannington Community College, a public primary and junior high school (K-10), and Sevenoaks Senior College, a senior secondary college (Years 11 and 12) are located in Cannington.

Transport
Cannington is on Albany Highway, a primary route into the Perth central business district, and lies to the southeast of Leach Highway and to the northwest of Roe Highway. Manning Road (State Route 26) provides access to Curtin University of Technology and Kwinana Freeway.

Cannington is home to Cannington railway station which serves the Armadale and Thornlie lines. The Station is due to be upgraded in 2023 as part of Metronet. Cannington will be elevated and modernised as well as other stations on the Line. Cannington also has a Bus Interchange with 9 stands. The station has many bus routes like the 280 which operates to High Wycombe railway station and connects the Armadale and Thornlie lines to the newly constructed Airport line. Also there are routes like the 208 and 508 which connects Cannington to the Mandurah line. These bus routes are operated by Swan Transit and Path Transit

Politics
Cannington has a broadly lower-middle-class, mixed-ethnic population and supports the Australian Labor Party at both Federal and state elections.

See also
 City of Canning
 Westfield Carousel

References

External links

 
Suburbs of Perth, Western Australia
Suburbs in the City of Canning